William de Grandison (died 1335), was an English noble, and Deputy Justiciar of North Wales.

William was a younger son of Pierre de Grandison and Agnes Neufchâtel. He was the younger brother of key ally and envoy, for King Edward I of England, Otto de Grandson, Grandison being an anglicisation of Grandson.

He served in the household of Edmund, Earl of Lancaster and was active in the wars in Gascony and Scotland. During 1292, he was granted a license to crenellate his manor of Ashperton, Herefordshire.

Marriage and issue
William married Sybil, daughter of John de Tregoz and Mabel FitzWarin, they are known to have had the following known issue:
Edmund de Grandison
Piers de Grandison, married Blanche Mortimer.
John de Grandison, Bishop of Exeter.
Thomas de Grandison, cleric.
William de Grandison, Archdeacon of Exeter.
Otho de Grandison, married Beatrice Malmayns, had issue.
Mabel de Grandison, married John de Pateshull, had issue.
Katherine de Grandison, married William Montagu, 1st Earl of Salisbury, had issue.
Agnes de Grandison, married John Northwode, had issue.
Maud de Grandison, nun at Aconbury Priory.

Citations

References

 

Year of birth unknown
1335 deaths
People from Savoie
Savoyards in Thirteenth Century England
William